Catcher is a position for a baseball or softball player. It is also a general term for a fielder who catches the ball in cricket. It is also the function and name of the circus performer who catches the flyer on the flying trapeze.

Catcher or catchers may also refer to:

Catchers (band), Irish indie pop band 
The Catcher, 1998 horror film directed by Guy Crawford and Yvette Hoffman

See also
The Catcher in the Rye (disambiguation)
Foxcatcher, 2014 American true crime sports drama film directed by Bennett Miller